Transcom Group Limited is a Bangladeshi business conglomerate. The businesses under this group include beverage, pharmaceuticals, newspaper, radio channel, electronics, foods, etc. Transcom is the local agent or comprador of international brands. This group employs more than 10,000 people. Transcom Group is one of the oldest and biggest companies in Bangladesh. Their operation in Bangladesh initially started in 1985 as a tea plantation company.

History
Latifur Rahman established Transcom Group in 1973 after W Rahman Jute Mills, the major earning source for the Rahman family, was nationalised in 1972. This diversified business house now has interests in many segments in the industrial and service sectors in Bangladesh. Transcom is the local agent or comprador of international brands like Pizza Hut, KFC, Pepsi and Philips, etc. Leading Danish insulin manufacturer Novo Nordisk has also chosen Transcoms pharmaceutical company Eskayef as the sole manufacturer of its products after China and India in Asia.

Some of the foreign brands managed by the group include: Pepsi, 7Up, Mirinda, Mountain Dew, Diet Pepsi, 7up Light, Aquafina, Sting, Evervess, KFC, Pizza Hut, Philips N.V, Whirlpool, Maybelline, Garnier, Heinz, Frito-Lay, Lindt, Servier, Novo Nordisk.

Transcom Group also owns two major newspapers, The Daily Prothom Alo and The Daily Star, and an FM radio channel, ABC Radio, to advocate in favour of their business policy.

Some other ventures by Transcom Group include pharmaceuticals (Eskayef Pharmaceuticals Ltd.), distribution (Transcom Distribution Company ltd), etc.

The chairman and CEO of Transcom Group, Latifur Rahman, won the 2012 Oslo Business for Peace Award for maintaining commitment to social responsibility and ethical values. Rahman was also the vice president of ICC Bangladesh, and chairman of Nestlé Bangladesh, Holcim Bangladesh and National Housing Finance and Investments. He was a director of Linde Bangladesh (formerly British Oxygen) and member of the governing board of BRAC, the world's largest non-governmental organization.

List of companies

Companies 
 Transcom Ltd.
 Reliance Insurance Limited
 Eskayef Pharmaceuticals Ltd.
 Transcom Beverages Limited (PepsiCo and its subsidiaries)
 Transcom Consumer Products Limited (PepsiCo, Mars, Conagra Brands, Kraft Heinz and its subsidiaries)
 Transcom Distribution Company Ltd. (L'Oréal)
 Transcom Electronics Limited (Samsung, Hitachi, Siemens etc.)
 Bangladesh Lamps Limited (BLL); is one of the oldest organization of the Transcom Group. Bangladesh Lamps Limited was established in Bangladesh in the year of 1962 at the time of East Pakistan, as East Pakistan Lamps Limited. They started the production of Philips GLS (General Lighting Services). BLL has other two production unit those are FTL(Fluorescent Tubular Lighting) and CFL(Compact Fluorescent Lighting). In 1993, Transcom purchased it. CFL Production unit started in 2008 and FTL started its production at 2011. The product of both CFL and FTL production units are branded as Transtec CFL and Transtec Tube Light. Almost 600 employees are working in BLL .It is enlisted as Engineering Firm in the Dhaka stock exchange.
 Bangladesh Electrical Industries Ltd.
 Transcom Foods Limited (Yum! Brands, A&W Restaurants)
 Mediastar Ltd.
 Prothom Alo (major newspaper in Bangladesh)
 ABC Radio (major private radio station in Bangladesh)
 Chorki (major OTT platform in Bangladesh)
 Biggan Chinta (teen's science magazine)
 Transcraft Limited
 Tea Holdings Ltd.
 Trinco Ltd.
 Transfin Ltd.
 Monipur Tea Co. Ltd.
 Marina Tea Co. Ltd.
 M.Rahman Tea Co. Ltd.

Associates 
 Mediaworld Ltd.
 The Daily Star

See also
 List of companies of Bangladesh

References

External links
 Official Website

Conglomerate companies of Bangladesh
1973 establishments in Bangladesh
PepsiCo bottlers